Meriwether is an American alternative rock band from Baton Rouge, Louisiana, formed in 2003. The band currently consists of lead vocalist and guitarist Andrew Reilley, bassist and Josh Barbier, and drummer Brett Schexnayder.

History 
Meriwether released their debut full-length LP, Make Your Move, in 2005 on start-up label GVE Records and sold over 10,000 copies and played over 300 shows in one year to promote the album by booking shows via MySpace. The band signed to Suretone Records in 2006 and the album Make Your Move was re-released in 2007, minus the songs "Aye Julian", "Girl In Mexico", & "And Tonic ER." Then Meriwether proceeded to record their second album, Sons of Our Fathers, with Grammy-nominated producer Howard Benson (My Chemical Romance, Three Days Grace) and mixed by Chris Lord-Alge (Underoath, AFI). After the album was finished, Meriwether continued to tour, while the release date was set back numerous times, until finally it was announced that Meriwether was no longer with Suretone. The album was never officially released, but it is currently available for free download on Bandcamp. The band recorded and released a new album, Plug in the Snakes, at the end of 2009 independently at Little House Studios in Baton Rouge. Meriwether played their last show with band members guitarist, Stefon Bergeron and bassist, Josh Barbier, on July 16, 2010. Sam Anderson left to play drums for the band 10 Years. In 2012, Meriwether went back in with original producer of Make Your Move, Rhett Mouton, and recorded the EP, Save Our Souls. In December 2013, the ten-year anniversary of the band, Meriwether performed a show at the Varsity Theatre in their hometown of Baton Rouge with all original members.

Currently Andrew Reilley, lead vocalist for the band, is continuing Meriwether as well as multiple new projects, such as Discovery Corps, which released two songs titled "Call Tte Cops" and "Dr. Midnight", debuting the live act in Austin, Texas, at SXSW 2011. Meriwether performed two shows in their hometown of Baton Rouge in 2014, including their 6th annual Zombie Prom event.

Stefon Bergeron now lives in Paris France and composes music for film, television and video games.

Members 
Current
 Andrew Reilley - lead vocals, guitar (2003–present)
 Joshua Barbier - bass (2003–2010)
 Brett Schexnayder - drums, percussion (2003–2008)

Former
 Sam Anderson - drums, percussion (2008–2010)
 Stefon Bergeron - guitar (2003–2010)(2017-2018)
 Bob Reilley - drums (2012–2017)
 Skip Angelle - guitar, backing vocals (2008–2017)
 James Brent Armstrong (2012-2017

Discography

Studio albums

EPs

Singles and music videos
2010: "If You Had Guts, I'd Hate 'Em"

References

External links
Official Website
Drew Reilley of Meriwether at voxamps.com
Myspace
Purevolume
The Advocate
Fuse
225 Baton Rouge
NME
Suretone
Yahoo!
Dean Guitars
Presonus
Alternative Press
Bandcamp

Musical groups established in 2003
Alternative rock groups from Louisiana
Musical groups from Baton Rouge, Louisiana